Inaros I of Athribis (fl. c. 665 BC) was an ancient Egyptian prince who rebelled against the Assyrians during their short-lived occupation of Egypt. His struggle against the Assyrians gave rise to a whole cycle of stories, known as The Inaros Stories, the latest of which date to the 2nd century AD, about 750 years after his death.

Little is known about the historical events surrounding his rebellion, apart from the fact that he came from a prominent family. He was a son of prince Bokennife of Athribis, who is mentioned in the annals of the Assyrian king Ashurbanipal, and his grandfather was prince Petese of Athribis, who is mentioned on the Triumphal Stele of the Kushite king Piye. Both his father and grandfather were deified after their deaths.

Inaros I is often confused in both ancient and modern literature with his namesake Inaros II, who rebelled against the Persians about 200 years later.

References
Ryholt, K. ‘The Assyrian Invasion of Egypt in Egyptian Literary Tradition’, Assyria and Beyond: Studies Presented to Mogens Trolle Larsen, edited by J.G. Dercksen, Leiden, Nederlands Instituut voor het Nabije Oosten, 2004, pp. 384–511.
Quack, J.F. ‘Inaros, Held von Athribis.’Altertum und Mittelmeerraum: Die antike Welt diesseits und jenseits der Levante. Festschrift für Peter W. Haider zum 60. Geburtstag, edited by R. Rollinger and B. Truschnegg, Oriens et Occidens 12, Stuttgart, Franz Steiner Verlag, 2006, pp. 499–505.

7th-century BC Egyptian people
Ancient Egyptian princes
Egyptian rebels